H64 may refer to:
 Spectr-H64, a 2001 block cipher
 HMS Duchess (H64)
 HMS Beverley (H64), a ship of the Royal Navy which saw service during World War II